Blue Pennant is an unincorporated community in Boone County, West Virginia, United States. At one time, it was known as Red Dragon, which has closed its post office. Red Dragon as a community was also called Kam and then Mordue.

The community most likely was named after the local Blue Pennant coal company.

References 

Unincorporated communities in West Virginia
Unincorporated communities in Boone County, West Virginia
Coal towns in West Virginia